Scopula nigristellata is a moth of the  family Geometridae. It is found in Indonesia and New Guinea.

Subspecies
Scopula nigristellata nigristellata (Maluku Islands: Bacan)
Scopula nigristellata nivimontium Prout, 1938 (New Guinea)

References

Moths described in 1898
nigristellata
Moths of Indonesia
Moths of New Guinea